The 121st New York Infantry Regiment, commonly known as the "Onesers" or "Upton's Regulars", was a volunteer regiment recruited during the American Civil War from Otsego County and Herkimer County, New York. The Hon. Richard Franchot was appointed colonel of the regiment and authorized to establish his headquarters at Richfield Springs, Otsego County. He proceeded without delay to organize the regiment, and on August 23, 1862, the regiment was mustered into the service of the Union Army.  The command at that time consisted of 39 officers and 946 enlisted men.  The 121st Regiment proceeded to Washington, arriving there on the morning of September 3, and was assigned provisionally to a brigade under Colonel Gibson with headquarters at Fort Lincoln.

On the march to the South Mountain and Antietam battlefields the regiment was assigned to the Second Brigade, First Division, Sixth Corps and remained with the command during its entire term of service.

Colonel Richard Franchot resigned on September 25, 1862, and selected Colonel Emory Upton, at the time a first lieutenant in the Regular army, under whose command the regiment made a record second to none in the Army of the Potomac.

There is an interesting controversy concerning who captured Confederate Major General Custis Lee, son of Robert E. Lee, at the Battle of Sailor's Creek Virginia on April 6, 1865. Private Harris Hawthorn of the 121st New York claimed his capture and applied for and received the Medal of Honor for this act in the year 1894. The 37th Massachusetts Infantry disputed this award in the year 1897, claiming that Private David Dunnels White of their regiment was the actual captor of Major General Custis Lee. This entire matter is currently under review by the United States Army.

Organization
The companies were recruited principally from these towns and organized by region:
A Company:  Manheim, Little Falls, Salisbury, and Danube
B  Company: Winfield, Plainfield, Litchfield, German Flatts, Columbia, and Stark
C  Company: Fairfield, Russia, Herkimer, and Newport
D  Company: Frankfort, Warren, Manheim, Schuyler, Columbia, and Salisbury
E  Company: Middlefeild, Milford, Cherry Valley, Hartwick, Springfield, Otsego, and Roseboom
F  Company: Edmeston, Exeter, Unadilla, Otsego, and Maryland
G  Company: Cherry Valley, Roseboom, Decatur, Middlefield, Westford, Worcester, and Herkimer
H  Company: Little Falls, Richfield, Salisbury, and Otesego
I  Company: Milford, Laurens, Morris, Wochester, Pittsfield, Hartwick, and German Flatts
K  Company: Laurens, New Lisbon, Oneonta, Burlington, Otesgo, Butternuts, Pittsfield, and Plainfield

References
Final Report on the Battlefield of Gettysburg (New York at Gettysburg) by the New York Monuments Commission for the Battlefields of Gettysburg and Chattanooga.  Albany, NY: J.B. Lyon Company, 1902

External links
New York State Military Museum and Veterans Research Center - Civil War - 121st Infantry Regiment History, photographs, table of battles and casualties, monument at Gettysburg, and battle flags of the 121st regiment.
Monument to the 121st NY Volunteer Infantry as it appeared when completed in 1889
Two Brothers -One North, One South is a story about patriotism
 Sixth Corps Breakthrough at Petersburg, April 2, 1865 
Isaac O. Best, History of the 121st New York State Infantry see also 
"Upton's Regulars: the 121st New York State Infantry in the Civil War", Cilella, Salvatore G.,The University Press of Kansas, 2009

Further reading
"Upton's Regulars: the 121st New York State Infantry in the Civil War", Cilella, Salvatore G.,The University Press of Kansas, 2009
"Subdued by the Sword: A Line Officer in the 121st New York Volunteers", Greiner, James M., State University of New York, 2003
Two Brothers -One North, One South is a story about patriotism

Infantry 121
Infantry 121
Military units and formations established in 1862
Military units and formations disestablished in 1865